The Hospital de la Caridad in Seville, Spain is a baroque charity hospital building near Plaza de toros de la Real Maestranza de Caballería de Sevilla. The charity hospital was founded in 1674, and still cares for the aged and infirm. The hospital's chapel is open to the public and "contains some of Seville's most sumptuous baroque sculpture." Bartolomé Esteban Murillo in 1668 painted eight paintings commissioned for Seville's Hermandad de la Caridad, to which the artist himself belonged and one of whose commandments was to clothe the naked. Four of those eight works remain in Seville (The Miracle of the Loaves and Fishes, Moses at the Rock of Horeb, Saint Elizabeth of Hungary [returned to Spain 1815] and Saint John of God Carrying a Sick Man), whereas the Washington work and the other three were looted by Napoleonic commander and Marechal Nicolas Jean-de-Dieu Soult in 1810 (The Healing of the Paralytic, National Gallery, London; Abraham Receiving the Three Angels, National Gallery of Canada; The Liberation of Saint Peter, Hermitage Museum).

References

Buildings and structures in Seville
17th-century Roman Catholic church buildings in Spain
Buildings and structures completed in 1676
Hospital buildings completed in the 17th century
Hospitals established in the 17th century
1676 establishments in Spain
Hospitals in Spain